Andrzej Bogusław Ćwierz (born 20 August 1947) is a Polish politician. He was elected to Sejm on 25 September 2005, getting 6161 votes in 22 Krosno district as a candidate from the Law and Justice list.

See also
Members of Polish Sejm 2005-2007

External links
Andrzej Ćwierz - parliamentary page - includes declarations of interest, voting record, and transcripts of speeches.

1947 births
Living people
People from Przeworsk
Law and Justice politicians
Members of the Polish Sejm 2005–2007
Members of the Polish Sejm 2007–2011